Padua Franciscan High School is a private co-educational Franciscan college-preparatory school in Parma, Ohio.  It is within the Roman Catholic Diocese of Cleveland.

History
Founded in 1961 as a private school for boys, Padua Franciscan became co-educational in 1983 and is the largest co-ed private school in northeast Ohio.

School year
The school year is made up of two 90-day semesters which are subdivided into four 9-week grading quarters. A typical school day consists of eight 41-minute periods and a 26-minute lunch.

Padua offers remedial, basic, regular, honors, and Advanced Placement (AP) courses in a variety of subjects. To graduate from Padua, each student must complete a core curriculum of 24 credits over the four years. The curriculum includes:
- 4 credits in Theology
- 4 credits in English
- 3 credits in Social Studies (World History, American History, American Government)
- 3 credits in Mathematics
- 2 credits in a Foreign Language (2 consecutive years of one of the following: Spanish, German, Italian, Latin, or French. Greek is also given but as a non credit course.)
- 3 credits in Science (Biology and a second lab science are required. The third need not be a lab.)
- 1 credit in Fine Arts (theatrics, music, art, etc.)
- 1/2 credit in Physical Education
- 1/2 credit in Health
- 1/2 credit in Computer Science
- 2 1/2 credits in Electives (Padua offers a variety of electives)
Along with this, every student is required to complete a yearly Service Learning Requirement that is different according to grade level*

Padua has a MedTrack program to educate students who are interested in a career in science and medicine.
Padua has the following MyTrack Programs: Business, Computer Science, Engineering, Fine Arts, and Law.

Athletics
Padua competes in Ohio High School Athletic Association (OHSAA).  Padua competes in the Crown Conference, which was formed in 2021.  Padua was previously a member of the first iteration of the Crown Conference from 1967-1980  and the North Coast League from 1984-2020.

Boys' sports: Tennis, Cross Country, Football, Golf, Soccer, Basketball, Hockey, Swimming, Wrestling, Baseball, Lacrosse, Track & Field, Figure Skating, Bowling.

Girls' sports: Cross Country, Golf, Soccer, Tennis, Volleyball, Basketball, Swimming, Softball, Track & Field, Figure Skating, Gymnastics, Cheerleading, Bowling, Lacrosse.

Ohio High School Athletic Association State Championships

 Hockey - 1988, 1989, 2006
 Volleyball - 2008, 2009, 2013, 2016, 2017

Notable alumni

 Andrew Carmellini – chef and restaurateur in New York City; earned a Michelin Star, James Beard Award nominee
 Sean Faris – actor, most notable for playing Jake Tyler in Never Back Down
 Dan Fritsche – former NHL player
 Brian Holzinger – retired NHL player
 Josh Robert Thompson – actor and comedian
 Tom Andrews – collegiate/professional football player
 Reggie Lee – actor, most notable for playing Sergeant Drew Wu on Grimm (TV series)

References

External links
 

Franciscan high schools
High schools in Cuyahoga County, Ohio
Catholic secondary schools in Ohio
Parma, Ohio
Educational institutions established in 1961
1961 establishments in Ohio
Roman Catholic Diocese of Cleveland